The 2020–21 season is FC Van's 1st season in Armenian Premier League, and second in existence.

Season events
On 30 July 2020, it was announced that Van had been giving a license to compete in the Armenian Premier League for the 2020–21 season. On 31 July, Van confirmed Sevada Arzumanyan as their Head Coach.

On 24 August, the Football Federation of Armenia announced that that day's match between Van and Lori had been postponed due to cases of COVID-19 within the Lori squad.

On 9 September, the Football Federation of Armenia announced that Van's games away to Shirak, scheduled for 11 September, had been postponed.

On 29 September, the season was suspended indefinitely due to the escalating 2020 Nagorno-Karabakh conflict.

Transfers
On the 29 July, Anushavan Tarverdyan, Arsen Kaytov, Sos Tadevosyan, Aleksandr Ladik, Batraz Tedeyev and Evgeni Gavrilov all left the club after their contracts where terminated by mutual consent.

On 30 July, Vigen Begoyan, Vardan Bakalyan and Hovhannes Ilangyozyan all had their contracts with the club terminated by mutual consent.

On 31 July, Van announced the signing of Ebert and Vahagn Ayvazyan.

On 1 August, Van announced the permanent signing of Arman Khachatryan from Ararat-Armenia, after he played for the club on loan during the 2019–20 season.

On 2 August, Deou Dosa's contract with Van was terminated by mutual consent.

On 5 August, Van announced the signing of Henri Avagyan from Alashkert, David Ghandilyan and Mihran Manasyan from Lori, and Davit Nalbandyan on loan from Ararat-Armenia.

On 9 August, Van announced the signing of Aleksandr Tenyayev.

On 21 August, Van announced the signing of Garegin Kirakosyan. On 13 October, the FFA announced that the season would resume on 17 October.

On 3 October, Van announced the signing of Orbeli Hambardzumyan from Alay Osh.

On 23 January, Van announced the departure by mutual consent of Ashot Ayvazyan, Davit Ayvazyan, Arman Khachatryan, Ebert, Michael Gnolou, Mihran Petrosyan, Lie Pato Ngavouka-Tseke, Media Traore, Muslim Bammatgereev, David Ghandilyan, Orbeli Hambardzumyan and Mihran Manasyan.

On 1 February, Van confirmed that Stanislav Yefimov had left the club after his contract had expired.

On 2 February, Van announced the appointment of Konstantin Zaytsev as their new Head Coach.

On 4 February, Van announced the signings of David Papikyan, Alexander Hovhannisyan, Deou Dosa, Ruslan Isaev, Vladislav Vasilyev, Maxim Zestarev and Aleksandr Maksimenko.

On 9 February, Van announced the signing of Viulen Ayvazyan from Sevan.

On 18 February, Van announced the signings of Pavel Korkin and Aleksey Shishkin.

On 4 April, Van announced Emmanuel Mireku had now joined the club having signed a contract with Van in the winter transfer window and being unable to travel to Armenia from Ghana due to the COVID-19 pandemic.

Squad

Transfers

In

Loans in

Released

Friendlies

Competitions

Premier League

Results summary

Results by round

Results

Table

Armenian Cup

Statistics

Appearances and goals

|-
|colspan="16"|Players away on loan:
|-
|colspan="16"|Players who left Van during the season:

|}

Goal scorers

Clean sheets

Disciplinary Record

References

FC Van
Van